Fifteen Wives is a 1934 American mystery film directed by Frank R. Strayer and starring Conway Tearle, Natalie Moorhead and Raymond Hatton. After arriving from South America, a man is murdered at a New York hotel. When the police investigate, they discover he has fifteen wives.

Cast
 Conway Tearle as Insp. Decker Dawes  
 Natalie Moorhead as Carol Manning  
 Raymond Hatton as Det. Sgt. Meade  
 Noel Francis as Ruby Cotton  
 John Wray as Jason Getty  
 Margaret Dumont as Sybilla Crum  
 Ralf Harolde as The Electric Voice  
 Oscar Apfel as Dist. Atty. Kerry  
 Robert Frazer as Chemist  
 Henry C. Bradley as Davis - Hotel Manager  
 Lew Kelly as Connelly - Hotel Detective  
 Clarence Brown as Head Porter  
 Albert Pollet as Thompson  
 Almeda Fowler as Nurse  
 Dickie Moore as Young Boy

References

Bibliography
 Michael R. Pitts. Poverty Row Studios, 1929–1940: An Illustrated History of 55 Independent Film Companies, with a Filmography for Each. McFarland & Company, 2005.

External links
 

1934 films
1930s mystery drama films
American mystery drama films
Films directed by Frank R. Strayer
Chesterfield Pictures films
American black-and-white films
1934 crime drama films
American crime drama films
1930s English-language films
1930s American films